Judgement 2014 was a professional wrestling event promoted by DDT Pro-Wrestling (DDT). It took place on March 21, 2014, in Tokyo, Japan, at the Korakuen Hall. It was the eighteenth event under the Judgement name. The event aired domestically on Fighting TV Samurai.

Storylines
Judgement 2014 featured seven professional wrestling matches that involved different wrestlers from pre-existing scripted feuds and storylines. Wrestlers portrayed villains, heroes, or less distinguishable characters in the scripted events that built tension and culminated in a wrestling match or series of matches.

Event
The first match of the main card was dubbed "Monster Army Final" and was the last match of the Monster Army stable.

The next match was dubbed "DDT's Origin! Judgement Special Tag Team Match" and featured the team of Mikami and Nosawa Rongai, both founders of the promotion.

Next was a match that saw the participation of Aja Kong from Oz Academy.

The Right To Challenge Anytime, Anywhere Contract Battle Royal was a Rumble rules match for a KO-D Openweight Championship match at Max Bump 2014, on April 29. Five envelopes were suspended above the ring, four of which contained a "Right To Challenge Anytime, Anywhere" contract, giving the right to their holder to challenge any champion at any time in the following year. The last envelope contained a "Right To Challenge Your Favorite Wrestler" contract. Grabbing a contract resulted in being eliminated from the match.

Results

Right To Challenge Anytime, Anywhere Contract Battle Royal

Footnotes

References

External links
The official DDT Pro-Wrestling website

2014
2014 in professional wrestling
Professional wrestling in Tokyo